Vodopivec is a Slovenian surname. Notable people with the surname include:

Frano Vodopivec (1924–1998), Croatian cinematographer
Peter Vodopivec (born 1946), Slovenian historian and intellectual
Tin Vodopivec (born 1982), Slovenian comedian

Slovene-language surnames